The 2019 Ovo Energy Tour of Britain was an eight-stage men's professional road cycling race. It was the sixteenth running of the modern version of the Tour of Britain and the 79th British tour in total. The race started on 7 September 2019 in Glasgow and finished on 14 September 2019 in Manchester. It is part of the 2019 UCI Europe Tour.

Teams
A total of 20 teams raced in the 2019 Tour of Britain: 10 UCI WorldTeams, 5 UCI Professional Continental teams, 4 UCI Continental Teams, and a British national team. Each team started with six riders for a starting peloton of 120 riders, of which 106 finished the race.

UCI WorldTeams

 
 
 
 
 
 
 
 
 
 

UCI Professional Continental Teams

 
 
 
 
 

UCI Continental Teams

 
 
 Swift Carbon Pro Cycling
 

National Teams
 Great Britain

Route

Stages

Stage 1
7 September 2019 — Glasgow to Kirkcudbright,

Stage 2
8 September 2019 — Kelso to Kelso,

Stage 3
9 September 2019 — Berwick-upon-Tweed to Newcastle-upon-Tyne,

Stage 4
10 September 2019 — Gateshead to Kendal,

Stage 5
11 September 2019 — Birkenhead Park to Birkenhead Park,

Stage 6
12 September 2019 — Pershore - Pershore, (ITT)

Stage 7
13 September 2019 — Warwick to Burton Dassett Country Park,

Stage 8
14 September 2019 — Altrincham to Deansgate, Manchester,

Classification leadership

Classification standings

General classification

Points classification

Mountains classification

Sprints classification

Teams classification

References

External links
 

2019
Tour of Britain
Tour of Britain
Tour of Britain